Emigsville is a census-designated place (CDP) in York County, Pennsylvania, United States. The population was 2,672 at the 2010 census.

History
The Emig Mansion was listed on the National Register of Historic Places in 1984.

Geography
Emigsville is located in Manchester Township at  (40.005447, -76.732267), just north of the city of York.

Demographics

At the 2000 census there were 2,467 people, 1,045 households, and 731 families living in the CDP. The population density was 2,067.9 people per square mile (800.4/km). There were 1,086 housing units at an average density of 910.3/sq mi (352.4/km).  The racial makeup of the CDP was 93.88% White, 2.23% Black, 0.16% Native American, 1.58% Asian, 0.04% Pacific Islander, 1.22% from other races, and 0.89% from two or more races. Hispanic or Latino of any race were 2.03%.

Of the 1,045 households 27.4% had children under the age of 18 living with them, 58.5% were married couples living together, 7.8% had a female householder with no husband present, and 30.0% were non-families. 23.5% of households were one person and 10.0% were one person aged 65 or older. The average household size was 2.36 and the average family size was 2.77.

The age distribution was 21.0% under the age of 18, 6.8% from 18 to 24, 29.6% from 25 to 44, 22.5% from 45 to 64, and 20.1% 65 or older. The median age was 40 years. For every 100 females, there were 92.9 males. For every 100 females age 18 and over, there were 88.9 males.

The median household income was $44,116 and the median family income  was $47,420. Males had a median income of $37,370 versus $24,375 for females. The per capita income for the CDP was $19,740. About 2.0% of families and 3.1% of the population were below the poverty line, including none of those under age 18 and 8.3% of those age 65 or over.

Education
 

Motorcycle Technology Center

References

External links
Emigsville community website

Census-designated places in York County, Pennsylvania
Census-designated places in Pennsylvania